The 1983 FINA Women's Water Polo World Cup was the fourth edition of the event, organised by the world's governing body in aquatics, the International Swimming Federation (FINA). The event took place in Sainte-Foy, Quebec, Canada, from June 13 to June 19, 1983. The five participating teams, including the Canada's youth team (out-of-competition), played a full competition to decide the winner of the event.

Results Matrix

Standings

Finals
June 19, 1983 — Bronze Medal Match

June 19, 1983 — Gold Medal Match

Final ranking

References

FINA Women's Water Polo World Cup
International water polo competitions hosted by Canada
F
W
Water Polo World Cup
June 1983 sports events in Canada
Sport in Quebec
1983 in Quebec